The former French Roman Catholic Diocese of Saint-Papoul, now a Latin titular see, was created by Pope John XXII in 1317 and existed until the Napoleonic Concordat of 1811.

The seat of the diocese was at Saint-Papoul, in south-west France, in the modern department of Aude; it was some distance northeast of the main highway between Carcassonne and Toulouse,  where there was already a Benedictine monastery, founded in the eighth century and dedicated to Saint Papoul.  The bishop of Saint-Papoul was suffragan of the Archbishop of Toulouse.

The diocese existed until the French Revolution. It was one of the diocese scheduled to be suppressed under the Civil Constitution of the Clergy (1790). Under the Concordat of 1801 its territory was taken over by the Diocese of Carcassonne.

History 

In his bull of erection, issued on 22 February 1317, Pope John XXII stated that the population in the diocese of Toulouse was growing at such a pace that the Bishop was no longer able to govern his people effectively; and that therefore, having consulted with the cardinals, he had decided to promote the diocese of Toulouse into an Archbishopric and Metropolitanate, with four new dioceses, one of which was Saint-Papoul.

The Benedictine abbey of Saint-Papoul was converted into the Cathedral, and the monks were organized into a Cathedral Chapter consisting of twelve Canons led by a Prior Major (rather than Dean or Provost, since they remained a monastic community).  In 1670 the Chapter was converted into a college of twelve secular Canons, with a Provost and four prebendaries.

The Pope also made the church of Castelnaudary into a Collegiate Church of twelve Canons, with a Dean, a Sacristan, a Precentor; there were also to be three hebdomadary priests, 24 chaplains, two deacons and two subdeacons, as well as six clerics in minor orders.

In 1716, there were approximately 1,000 faithful Catholics in the town of Saint-Papuli, and the diocese contained forty-four parishes. In 1774 there were still approximately 1,000 faithful Catholics, owing temporal obedience to the King of France.

The diocese was suppressed on 29 November 1801 by Pope Pius VII, in accordance with the Napoleonic Concordat of 1801, its territory being reassigned to the Metropolitan Archdiocese of Toulouse and to the Diocese of Carcassonne.

Bishops of Saint-Papoul 

 Bernard de la Tour (11 July - death 27 December 1317)
 Raymond de Mostuèjouls (1319.04.16 – 1327.12.18), previously  Abbot of Saint-Thibéry (Saint Tiberius) and Prior of Saint-Flour, Bishop of Saint-Flour (France) (1317.07.31 – 1319.04.16); created Cardinal-Priest of S. Eusebio (18 December 1327 – death 15 October 1335), Protopriest of Sacred College of Cardinals (1334.12 – 1335.11.12)
 Guillaume de Cardailhac (1328-1347)
 Bernard de Saint-Martial = Bertrand de la Tour : 1348-1361; previously Bishop of Tulle (France) (1344.10.01 – 1347.02.19); later Bishop of Le Puy-en-Velay (France) (1361.12.18 – death ?9 August 1361 ?1382.05.14)
 Pierre de Cros I., Cluny branch of the Benedictine Order (O.S.B) (1362.07.27 – 1370.06.08); later Metropolitan Archbishop of Bourges (France) (8?9 June 1370 – 1374.08.02), Chamberlain of the Holy Roman Church of Reverend Apostolic Camera (1371.06.20 – 1388.11.16), Metropolitan Archbishop of Arles (France) (2 August 1274 – 1388.01), uncanonical Pseudocardinal-Priest of Saints Nereus and Achilleus (1383.12.23 – death 16 November 1388) under Antipope Clement VII
 Bernard de Castelnau, O.S.B : 1370-1375
 Pierre de Cros II. : 1375-1412
 Jean de La Rochetaillée : 1413-1418?
 Jean de Burle : 1418-1422
 Raymond Macrose (Mairose) : 1423-1426
 Pierre Soybert : 1427-1443
 Raymond de Lupault : 1451-ca. 1465
 Jean de La Porte : 1465-1468
 Denis de Bar: 1468-1471
 Clément de Brillac 1472-1495
 Denis de Bar 1495-1510 (second time)
 Karl de Bar 1510-1538
 Giovanni Salviati 1538-1549 (administrator; Cardinal)
 Bernardo Salviati 1549-1561 (Cardinal)
 Antoine-Marie Salviati 1561-1564 (Cardinal)
 Alexandre de Bardis 1564-1591
 Jean Raimond 1602-1604
 François de Donnadieu 1608-1626
 Louis de Claret 1626-1636
 Bernard Despruets 1636-1655
 Jean de Montpezat de Carbon 1657-1664
 Joseph de Montpezat de Carbon : 1664-1674
 François Barthélemy de Grammont : 1677-1716
 Gabriel-Florent de Choiseul-Beaupré : 1716-1723
 Jean-Charles de Ségur : 1724-1735
 Georges Lazare Berger de Charancy 1735-1738
 Daniel Bertrand de Langle : 1739-1774
 Guillaume-Joseph d'Abzac de Mayac : 1775-1784
 Jean-Baptiste-Marie de Maillé de La Tour-Landry 1784-1801

 Titular see 
On 2009.02.09 the diocese was nominally restored as Titular bishopric of Saint-Papoul (French) / Sancti Papuli (Latin adjective).

It has had the following incumbents, so far of the fitting Episcopal (lowest) rank :
 Bertrand Lacombe (2016.04.14 – ...), Auxiliary Bishop of Bordeaux (France).

 See also 
 List of Catholic dioceses in France
 Catholic Church in France

 Notes 

 Sources and external links  
 GCatholic - former and titular see
Bibliography - Reference works
 pp. 582–584. (Use with caution; obsolete)
  (in Latin) p. 390.
 (in Latin) p. 212.
 p. 253.
 pp. 273–274.
 pp. 280.
 p. 328.

Bibliography - Studies
Blanc, Jean (1982). L'abbaye de Saint-Papoul (Carcassonne 1982) 28pp.
Douaie, Célestin (1880). "État du diocèse de Saint-Papoul et sénéchaussée du Lauragais en 1573".  Mémoires de l'Académie des sciences, inscriptions, et belles-lettres de Toulouse''. Série 9, Tome 2 (1890), pp. 473–489. 
Du Bourg, Henry (1914).  "La saisie du temporal ecclésiastique du diocese de Saint-Papoul en 1582,"  Revue des questions historiques 96 [n.s. 52] (1914), pp. 69–81.

Saint-Papoul
1317 establishments in Europe
1310s establishments in France
Religious organizations established in the 1310s
Dioceses established in the 14th century
1801 disestablishments in France